Daniel Falkiner (1683 – 20 January 1759) was an Irish politician.

He was the second son of Daniel Falkiner and his wife Rebecca Blackwell, widow of Henry Hamilton of Baileborough. His cousin was Sir Riggs Falkiner, 1st Baronet. He represented Baltinglass in the Irish House of Commons from 1727 until his death in 1759. In 1739, Falkiner was appointed Lord Mayor of Dublin.

He married Sarah Spence, daughter of George Spence. They had a daughter and a son. Sir Frederick Falkiner, 1st Baronet was his great-grandson.

References

1683 births
1759 deaths
Irish MPs 1727–1760
Lord Mayors of Dublin
Members of the Parliament of Ireland (pre-1801) for County Wicklow constituencies